The Mass Party was a political party of Thailand's People's Alliance for Democracy (PAD).  Its main goal was campaigning against Thaksinomics.

Origins
In May 2006, PAD leaders established the Mass Party. Somkiat Pongpaiboon, party co-founder, claimed that "Our objective is to campaign against Thaksinomics." The mass party arose historically in opposition to the established élite or caucus-party system of the 18th to 19th centuries, representing the antithesis of the caucus party. The party unconventionally planned not to field MP candidates for the first five years, with Somkiat claiming that "If we field MP candidates, we will be trapped in vicious circles of money politics."  Other party co-founders included the former Palang Dharma Party leader, Chaiwat Sinsuwong, and the Campaign for Popular Democracy's, Pipob Thongchai. In 2009 PAD formed a new party called New Politics Party.

References

Defunct political parties in Thailand
Political parties established in 2006
Political parties disestablished in 2009
2006 establishments in Thailand
2009 disestablishments in Thailand